William Neville Scott OAM (4 October 1923 – 22 December 2005) was an Australian author, folklorist, songwriter, poet, and collector of bush ballads and Australian folk history. He has published anthologies of Australian bush songs, including the best selling book The Complete Book of Australian Folklore published in 1976. He was awarded the Order of Australia in 1992 for his contributions to folklore, folk music, and Australian literature. He was considered a living treasure, and his anthologies of songs and his donated collections continue his legacy.

Childhood and early career
Bill Scott was born in Bundaberg, Queensland, and grew up in Caboolture and Brisbane. He began writing poetry while serving in the Royal Australian Navy during World War II and had his first poem published in The Bulletin in 1944 when he was twenty-one.

After the war he traveled around Queensland working as a sugar cane cutter, umbrella maker, steam-engine driver, and gold-prospector. He was also a worker in the smelters of Mount Isa, and a seaman on a lighthouse tender in the 1950s before working at a publishing house.

Starting in 1974 he wrote full-time. In 1976 he compiled The Complete Book of Australian Folklore, a book that has been in print almost continuously ever since.  He also edited and compiled The Second Penguin Australian Songbook. Scott completed 51 books of prose and poetry, and is renowned as a collector and writer of Australian folk stories and songs. He also wrote novels, short stories, verse, biographies, magazine articles, anthologies and songs, with some of his poetry and short stories anthologised in various collections.

Late in life he moved from Brisbane to Warwick in the Darling Downs, where he spent his last 18 years of life. He wrote long letters "full of stories, news, ideas and weather reports from his beloved Condamine River". He shared little gifts, tapes, books and even a rock of smoky quartz from the Snowy Mountains, as a reminder of his prospecting days, with friends.

Accomplishments
Many of his poems are well known and recited by school children.  Scott was also a founding member of the Queensland Folk Federation that now runs the Woodford Folk Festival.  Ian McNamara of ABC Radio said, "We as people are all better off for the muse of a bloke like Bill."

His song Hey Rain  was used as the namesake for the documentary on his 50-year "folkie" career, with the subtitle The songs and stories of Bill Scott.  The documentary has been featured on ABC's Sunday afternoon program. ABC's description of the show notes, "Continuing the tradition of Australian bush poets like Henry Lawson and Banjo Paterson is...  Bill Scott. A popular performer at the Woodford Folk Festival over the years where most of this documentary is set, this is an affectionate look at a charming man with a lot of great memories." The documentary's liner notes say, "He's a story teller, he's Bill Scott, and this is his song".

An obituary in Folklore suggested the refrain of his poem "The Old Man's Song" as an epitaph: "What good is your life if it isn't a song?"

Hey Rain documentary
First broadcast on the ABC in 2005, Hey Rain is a documentary that celebrates the life and works of Bill Scott. "It looks at Bill's lifelong fascination with Australian folklore and the role he played in collecting it, loving it and bringing it to an ever widening audience. (It) touches on Bill's poems, stories and songs and contains performances by Dave de Hugard, Penny Davies and Roger Ilott, and it also features a song dedicated to Bill by that extraordinary performer, Ted Egan."

Bibliography

Song collections
 Bushranger Ballads (1976)
 The Second Australian Song Book (1980)
 Tape-recordings of his songs: "Hey, Rain!" and "Songbird in Your Pocket"
 CD of his songs Opal Miner - The Songs of Bill Scott recorded by Penny Davies and Roger Ilott in 1999 on Restless Music label
 Expanded CD of his songs accompanies DVD Hey Rain - The Songs and Stories of Bill Scott documentary seen on ABC TV

Notes

References
"Bill Scott passes away" (JAM: NSW Folk Federation) Accessed: 29 January 2007
"Passionate Bill loved folk: Renowned author leaves lasting legacy" by Jen Scott 28 December 2005 Warwick Daily News
It's an Honour William Neville Scott Medal of the Order of Australia, accessdate 19 December 2008
ABC Sunday Afternoon programming history accessdate 19 December 2008
"Bill Scott passes away" Jam.org article, accessdate 19 December 2008
Ian McNamara, ABC Radio, Australia All Over August 1999
Obituary 1 December 2006 Folklore

External links
 National Library of Australia – Extended Bibliography

1923 births
2005 deaths
Australian children's writers
People from Bundaberg
Recipients of the Medal of the Order of Australia
Royal Australian Navy personnel of World War II
Australian folklorists
20th-century Australian poets
Australian male poets
20th-century Australian male writers